A Sehra (Hindi: सेहरा) or Sehro (Gujarati: સેહરો) or Mundavalya (Marathi: मुण्डावळ्या) is a headdress worn by the groom during weddings in Indian subcontinent. This decorative groom’s veil can be made either out of flowers or beads and is tied to the groom’s turban or Pagdi.

The sehra has 2 main purposes:

They are intended to ward off the evil eye. Secondly, the bride and groom are not supposed to see each other before their wedding ceremony.

Therefore, a sehra solved the purpose of hiding the groom’s face, whereas the bride covered her face with a ghunghat or pallu. They are more prominently worn in North India than in other parts of the country.

Etymology 

The word Sehra is derived from Sanskrit word  Śīrṣahāra (शीर्षहार) meaning garland for decorating head. The word Sehra finds mentions in Braj poetry of Hindu Bhakti saint Suradāsa.

Sehrabandi 

The act of tying the sehra around the groom's head right before he leaves for the bride's house is called "Sehra Bandi". Typically the groom's sisters, female cousins, Bhabhi or sister-in-law are the essential performers of Sehra Bandi. In the case of multiple sisters or female relatives, each woman takes a turn to perform the ritual one by one. While carrying out this whole custom, all the women sing traditional wedding songs. Usually, women in the family perform the ritual in a hierarchical order based on the relation with the groom. For example, it begins with the groom's mother, the oldest sister, younger sister, oldest sister-in-law and so on.

Types of sehra 

Usually sehras are of two main types. The traditional sehra was made of flowers however nowadays beaded sehras are equally popular. A fresh floral sehra is the traditional sehra which is made up of flowers. A bejewelled sehra is made up of fancy jewels, stones and pearls.

References

Bangladeshi clothing
Indian clothing
Pakistani clothing
Marriage in Pakistan
Indian wedding clothing
Bangladeshi wedding